This is the list of the heads of state of Azerbaijan from 1918 to the present. 25 people have been head of the Azerbaijani state since its establishment in 1918. It includes leaders of short-lived Azerbaijan Democratic Republic (1918–1920), of Soviet Azerbaijan (1920–1991), and of post-Soviet era.

Multiple terms in office, consecutive or otherwise, are listed and counted in the first column (administration number) and the second column counts individuals.

The youngest head of state by his accession to office was Grigory Kaminsky, at age 25, and the oldest Heydar Aliyev, at age 70.

Leaders of Azerbaijan since 1918

Azerbaijan Democratic Republic (1918–1920)
Chairman of the Azerbaijani National Council

Chairman of Parliament

Transcaucasian Socialist Federative Soviet Republic (1922–1936) and Azerbaijan Soviet Socialist Republic (1936–1991)
Chairman of the Presidium of the Communist Party of Azerbaijan SSR

Executive Secretary of the Communist Party of Azerbaijan SSR

First Secretary of the Communist Party of Azerbaijan SSR

Republic of Azerbaijan (1990–present)
Presidents

See also
President of Azerbaijan
Prime Minister of Azerbaijan

References

External links
 Republic of Azerbaijan

Government of Azerbaijan
Lists of Azerbaijani people
Azerbaijan
Lists of political office-holders in Azerbaijan

Azer